State Highway 238 (SH 238) is a state highway running from Port Lavaca south to Seadrift.  The route was designated on December 22, 1936 from Port Lavaca to Inez. On September 26, 1939, it extended to Seadrift, replacing a portion of SH 27. On May 29, 1941, the section north of Port Lavaca was cancelled. On November 13, 1980, SH 238 was extended over Spur 346 from US 87 to SH 35.

Junction list

References

238
Transportation in Calhoun County, Texas